Seminar is the second album by American rapper Sir Mix-a-Lot. It was released on October 17, 1989 via Nastymix and was produced entirely by Sir Mix-a-Lot. The album peaked at number 67 on the Billboard 200, number 25 on the Top R&B/Hip-Hop Albums, and was certified gold by Recording Industry Association of America. It spawned three singles: "Beepers", which peaked at #61 on the Hot R&B/Hip-Hop Songs and #2 on the Hot Rap Songs, "My Hooptie", which peaked at #49 on the Hot R&B/Hip-Hop Songs and #7 on the Hot Rap Songs, and "I Got Game", which peaked at #86 on the Hot R&B/Hip-Hop Songs and #20 on the Hot Rap Songs.

Track listing

Sample credits
Track 1 contants elements from "Irresistible Bitch" by Prince (1983)
Track 2 contants elements from "Batdance" by Prince (1989)
Track 3 contants elements from "The Star-Spangled Banner" by Francis Scott Key & John Stafford Smith (1814)
Track 4 contants elements from "Posse on Broadway" by Sir Mix-a-Lot (1988) and "I Ain't Tha 1" by N.W.A (1988)
Track 6 contants elements from "Peek-a-Boo" by Siouxsie and the Banshees (1988) (the Siouxsie and the Banshees' sample was edited out on further editions)
Track 7 contants elements from "Hard to Get" by Rick James (1982)
Track 8 contants elements from "Swass" by Sir Mix-a-Lot (1988), "The New Style" by Beastie Boys (1986), "Posse on Broadway" by Sir Mix-a-Lot (1988), "Al-Naafiysh (The Soul) (B-Side)" by Hashim (1983), and "Hard Times" by Run-DMC (1984)
Track 10 contants elements from "Rebel Without a Pause" by Public Enemy (1987) and "Change the Beat (Female Version)" by Beside (1982)

Personnel
 Anthony Ray - performer, producer, engineering, programming
 Ed Locke - executive producer
 Ron McMaster - mastering
 Heather J. Morrison - vocals (track 6)
 Jana Marie Doniger - vocals (track 6)
 Jennifer Wells - vocals (track 6)

Charts

Weekly charts

Year-end charts

Singles

Certifications

References

External links 

1989 albums
Sir Mix-a-Lot albums
Nastymix Records albums
American Recordings (record label) albums
Albums recorded at Robert Lang Studios